Liu Mingjiu (April 1934 – 15 December 2022) was a Chinese translator. He was the first Chinese to translate Jean-Paul Sartre's works into Chinese, and was also known as the first person in Jean-Paul Sartre's research in China. He was among the first few in China who translated the works of Albert Camus's into Chinese language. His translations are well respected by domestic and international scholars. 

In his later career, he was a researcher of the Institute of Foreign Literature of the Chinese Academy of Social Sciences, director of its Southern Europe and Latin American Literature Research Department and professor of its Foreign Languages Department of the Graduate School. He was the president of the French Literature Research Association of China, director of the Chinese Foreign Literature Research Association, a member of the China Writers Association and a member of the International Pen Center.

Biography
Liu was born in Changsha, Hunan, in April 1934. His father was a cook. He has two brothers. He secondary studied at Hunan Provincial First High School. In 1953 he was accepted to Peking University, where he majored in French language and literature. After university, he was assigned to the Institute of Literature, Ministry of Social Sciences of China. In 1964 he was transferred to the Institute of Foreign Literature, Chinese Academy of Social Sciences, becoming a member of Honorary Department of Chinese Academy of Social Sciences in 2006. After 1981, he went to the United States and France for many academic visits. In 2000, he was officially selected as the subject of doctoral dissertation at the University of Paris, France.

Personal life and death
Liu married Zhu Hong, who is an expert in British and American culture. Their son, Liu Difei, died at the age of 37. The couple had a granddaughter named Liu Yicun who lives in the United States.

Liu died on 15 December 2022, at the age of 88.

Works

Translations
 Boule de Suif
 Selected Short Stories by Maupassant
 The Stranger
 Last Lesson: A Selection of Dude's Short Stories
 Carmen
 The Essence of Merrill's Novel
 The Little Prince

Awards
On 19 November 2018, he was awarded the Lifetime Achievement Award in Translation, one of the most prestigious translation prizes in China.

References

1934 births
2022 deaths
Peking University alumni
Writers from Changsha
French–Chinese translators
People's Republic of China translators